Hymenophyllum howense is a fern in the family Hymenophyllaceae. The specific epithet refers to the locality of occurrence.

Description
The fern has a wiry, creeping rhizome, with adpressed, reddish brown hairs. Its 3- or 4-pinnatifid fronds combine a 2–7 cm long stipe with a triangular-ovate lamina 4–6 cm long and 2–5 cm wide.

Distribution and habitat
The fern is endemic to Australia’s subtropical Lord Howe Island in the Tasman Sea; it occurs in cloud forest on and around the summits of Mounts Lidgbird and Gower.

References

howense
Ferns of Australia
Endemic flora of Lord Howe Island
Plants described in 1960